Twilight of the Porn Stars is a British documentary created by Louis Theroux for the BBC, aired on 10 June 2012. The documentary is a 60-minute film covering amateur pornography and the rise of video uploads and their effect on the pornography industry. The film is intended as a follow-up to the Louis Theroux's Weird Weekends episode, "Porn".

See also
List of Louis Theroux documentaries

References

Louis Theroux's BBC Two specials
BBC television documentaries
2012 television specials